The 1994 P&G Taiwan Women's Tennis Open was a women's tennis tournament played on outdoor hard courts at the Taipei Municipal Tennis Court in Taipei, Taiwan that was part of the Tier IV category of the 1994 WTA Tour. It was the seventh and last edition of the tournament and was held from 14 November through 20 November 1994. First-seeded Wang Shi-ting won the singles title and earned $18,000 first-prize money.

Finals

Singles

 Wang Shi-ting defeated   Kyōko Nagatsuka 6–1, 6–3
 It was Wang's 1st singles title of the year and the 3rd of her career.

Doubles

 Michelle Jaggard-Lai /  Rene Simpson-Alter defeated  Nancy Feber /  Alexandra Fusai 6–0, 7–6(12–10)
 It was Jaggard-Lai's 1st doubles title of the year and the 2nd and last of her career. It was Simpson-Alter's 1st doubles title of her career.

References

External links
 ITF tournament edition details 
 Tournament draws

Taipei Women's Championship
Taipei Women's Championship
Taipei Women's Championship, 1994
Taipei Women's Championship, 1994